The women's javelin throw competition at the 2004 Summer Olympics in Athens was held at the Olympic Stadium on 25–27 August.

Competition format
Each athlete receives three throws in the qualifying round. All who achieve the qualifying distance progress to the final. If less than twelve athletes achieve this mark, then the twelve furthest throwing athletes reach the final. Each finalist is allowed three throws in last round, with the top eight athletes after that point being given three further attempts.

Schedule
All times are Greece Standard Time (UTC+2)

Records
, the existing World and Olympic records were as follows.

The following records were established during the competition:

Results

Qualifying round
Rule: Qualifying standard 61.00 (Q) or at least best 12 qualified (q).

Final

References

External links
Official Olympic Report

W
Javelin throw at the Olympics
2004 in women's athletics
Women's events at the 2004 Summer Olympics